Coenonympha symphita, or Lederer's heath, is a butterfly belonging to the family Nymphalidae. It is found in north-eastern Turkey, south-western Georgia, and north-western Armenia.

The habitat is calcareous grasslands at 2000–2500 m above sea level. Its flight period is from early June to mid-July in one generation per year. The larvae feed on Poa annua.

Subspecies
Coenonympha symphita symphita Lederer, 1870 (Georgia)
Coenonympha symphita karsiana Sheljuzhko, 1929 (Transcaucasia)

References

External links
Butterfly Conservation Armenia

Coenonympha
Butterflies described in 1870
Taxa named by Julius Lederer